Grace Baptist is a name used by various churches and associations, in different parts of the world, who would align with Reformed Baptists, who hold to Calvinistic doctrine, but would consider themselves distinct in their own right. This distinguishes them from General Baptists who instead hold to an Arminian theology.

History

United Kingdom
Grace Baptist churches in the UK have mainly derived from the Strict Baptists or Strict and Particular Baptists.  The Strict Baptist Assembly,  established in 1964, held to beliefs outlined in the Baptist Affirmation of Faith 1966.  The Assembly of Baptist Churches was established in 1976 and held to the Calvinistic doctrine of Sovereign Grace.  Through discussions between the Strict Baptist Assembly and the Assembly of Baptist Churches came a conviction and desire to establish a single Assembly which in 1980 this gave rise to the joint Grace Baptist Assembly.

Alongside the establishment of the Assemblies was the establishment of Associations of Strict Baptist Churches of which there were three. These continue today under the updated titles of Associations of Grace Baptist Churches, listed below.

U.S. and Canada
Some Churches in the U.S. and Canada adopt association with Grace Baptists in the United Kingdom.  They do not share the historical developments which lead to Sovereign Grace Baptists.

Associations
United Kingdom
Association of Grace Baptist Churches (South East), 
Association of Grace Baptist Churches (East Anglia), 
Association of Grace Baptist Churches (West Anglia),

Churches
Notable churches which are members of Grace Baptist associations, or are known as Grace Baptist, include:

United Kingdom
Kew Baptist Church, Kew, Richmond, London
Homerton Baptist Church, Homerton, Hackney, London

United States
Grace Baptist Church (Spokane, Washington), which is on the U.S. National Register of Historic Places
Willis Presbyterian Church and Cemetery, which is on the U.S. National Register of Historic Places
Grace Baptist Church of Philadelphia

Schools
Notable schools named "Grace Baptist" include:
United States
Grace Baptist Christian School (Tifton, Georgia)
Grace Baptist School (Portland, Maine)

See also
Sovereign Grace Baptists
Calvinism
1689 Baptist Confession of Faith
History of the Calvinist–Arminian debate
List of Strict Baptist churches

References

External links
Grace Baptist Assembly, United Kingdom
 

Baptist denominations
Calvinist and Reformed denominations